Presbyterian Univ. Station is a station of the BGLRT Line of Busan Metro in Samgye-dong, Gimhae, South Korea. The station name comes from Busan Presbyterian University located at 900 meters from this station. At this station, there are no direct city bus routes.

Station Layout

Exits

External links
  Cyber station information from Busan Transportation Corporation

Busan Metro stations
Busan–Gimhae Light Rail Transit
Metro stations in Gimhae
Railway stations opened in 2011